Trenton Transit Center is the main passenger train station in Trenton, New Jersey.  It is the southernmost stop in New Jersey on the Northeast Corridor. It is the terminus for NJ Transit trains to and from New York City and SEPTA Trenton Line Regional Rail trains to and from Philadelphia, Pennsylvania, and an intermediate station for Amtrak trains traveling between the two cities along the Northeast Corridor.

The northern terminus of the River Line light rail system, which offers service to Camden along the Delaware River, is across Clinton Avenue from the main station building.

Bus service at the station consists of local NJ Transit routes, including Capital Connection buses, serving the New Jersey Capitol Complex, and regional service to Philadelphia via Camden. In addition, the station serves as the northern terminus for SEPTA buses to Oxford Valley Mall. Greyhound bus service to the station was previously available but has been discontinued.

Trenton is the only city in New Jersey to serve three major railway systems in the state (Amtrak, NJ Transit, and SEPTA).

Facilities 

Trenton Transit Center has two levels; the upper level with ticket offices, ticket machines, a Dunkin' Donuts and newsstand, the Pizza Grill, a snack kiosk, two sets of restrooms, a bank branch, an Auntie Anne's pretzel shop, and a McDonald's restaurant. The upper level of the station also crosses Assunpink Creek. From the upper level, stairs and elevators lead down to the two island platforms for the trains. The eastbound island platform (Tracks 1 & 2) also has a newsstand/snack kiosk as well as NJT ticket machines. 

Unlike most large Amtrak stations along the Northeast Corridor, there is no checked baggage service.

A $56.6 million renovation is currently underway, which will include an addition of a mezzanine level providing additional office and retail space. New lighting, air-conditioning, information displays, escalators, and elevators will also be installed. Construction is anticipated to last two years.

Across the street is the River Line light rail station that connects to Camden.

History

Rail service in Trenton dates back to the days of the Camden and Amboy Railroad, which built a station on East Street in 1837, until it was moved to the current site in 1863. The C&A was merged into the United New Jersey Railroad and Canal Company in 1867 and acquired by the Pennsylvania Railroad in 1893, which replaced the station the same year. As with many PRR stations, especially in New Jersey, the station became a Penn Central station once the New York Central merged with the PRR in 1968. Amtrak took over intercity railroad service in 1971, but Penn Central continued to serve commuters, even as the station building closed in 1972. In 1976, the bankrupt Penn Central and Amtrak built the new Trenton Rail Station just before Penn Central's rail assets were taken over by Conrail. It was built to a standard template used at many Amtrak stations built in the 1970s and early 1980s, with a rectangular shape and a boxy, cantilevered metal roof. NJ Transit Rail Operations took over the station when it acquired Conrail's New Jersey commuter lines in 1983, but the station continued to serve Amtrak as well as SEPTA Regional Rail to Philadelphia. From 2006 to 2008, a major reconstruction project authorized by NJT took place with $46 million worth of federal aid, and $33 million worth of state funding that resulted in the current Trenton Transit Center.

Station description

Trenton Transit Center consists of a station building, four boarding locations, and a separate station for the River Line. The River Line terminal is across Clinton Avenue from the station building at street level, one story above the Northeast Corridor tracks.  The River Line station consists of two low-level side platforms and two tracks that end in bumper blocks. These two tracks cross over the Northeast Corridor and then bend southwards towards the river, where they head towards Camden.

Being the terminus for NJ Transit Northeast Corridor Line service and the last stop for Amtrak and SEPTA in New Jersey, Trenton is central Jersey's largest station facility, with the ability to load five trains across seven operational tracks at any given time. NJ Transit trains that terminate in Trenton discharge passengers and continue on a two-mile haul to the Morrisville Yard in Pennsylvania. SEPTA trains either remain idle at the station platform or park on a special siding on the northern side of the station reserved for these trainsets.  There are two express tracks – one in each direction – that can be used for trains running express from Philadelphia's 30th Street Station to Penn Station in Newark. The line narrows to four tracks for the majority of its length east and west of the station.  To the west, all trains traverse the Delaware River via the Morrisville–Trenton Railroad Bridge, entering Pennsylvania, at which point two tracks separate from the main line towards NJT's Morrisville Yard.

Being a major station along the Northeast Corridor, Trenton boards and receives passengers through the use of two lengthy platforms (for day-to-day operations) that can accommodate up to four trains on separate tracks at once. Both platforms are high-level, enabling faster boarding and greater accessibility for handicapped passengers. All tracks are accessed from an overpass that connects the train terminal to the front of the station and with parking facilities on the station level. Tracks 1 and 2 share an island platform and handle all service northbound towards New York Penn Station. Tracks 4 and 5 share an island platform and handle all service from New York and to and from Pennsylvania. Track 3 has a low-level platform and is largely unused except if one particular track is out of service or in an emergency.

One of the unique features of the Trenton station is that inbound NJ Transit trains from New York release passengers on the same track reserved for SEPTA operations, deliberately allowing for an efficient transfer between the two rail lines for continued service to Philadelphia. As a result, the aft ends of both trains may not be able to open their doors, since they extend past the ends of the platforms with both trains stopped on the same track.

All tracks are electrified with overhead catenary wires, as is the entire Northeast Corridor from Washington Union Station to Boston South Station.

Track layout
Note: Shows platform layouts only, not the actual station layout.

References

External links

SEPTA - Trenton Transit Center
Station Building from Google Maps Street View
Light Rail Station from Google Maps Street View
Station Building and track platforms from Bing Birds-eye View

SEPTA Regional Rail stations
Amtrak stations in New Jersey
Stations on the Northeast Corridor
NJ Transit Rail Operations stations
River Line stations
NJ Transit bus stations
Railway stations in Mercer County, New Jersey
Former Pennsylvania Railroad stations
Buildings and structures in Trenton, New Jersey
Transit hubs serving New Jersey
Transit centers in the United States
Railway stations in the United States opened in 1863